Rodenbeck is a 95% Black township of the city of Bloemfontein in South Africa.

References

Suburbs of Bloemfontein
Townships in the Free State (South African province)